Jason Nelms (born 1980) is an American Paralympic wheelchair basketball player from Huntsville, Alabama. He is a 2002 gold medalist at the  IWBF World Championship and got a bronze medal in 2010 at the same place. A year later, he was awarded a gold medal at the 2011 Parapan American Games and on 2012 Summer Paralympics he was awarded with another bronze one. He was also a four-time NWBA Champion from 2008 to 2012 (excluding 2009). He has been the head coach of the University of Texas at Arlington Lady Movin' Mavs women's wheelchair basketball team since its establishment in 2013.

References

External links 
 
 

1980 births
Living people
American men's wheelchair basketball players
Paralympic wheelchair basketball players of the United States
Paralympic bronze medalists for the United States
Paralympic medalists in wheelchair basketball
Wheelchair basketball players at the 2004 Summer Paralympics
Wheelchair basketball players at the 2008 Summer Paralympics
Wheelchair basketball players at the 2012 Summer Paralympics
Medalists at the 2012 Summer Paralympics
UT Arlington Mavericks men's wheelchair basketball players
Sportspeople from Huntsville, Alabama